Nutterville may refer to the following places:
Nutterville, Wisconsin
Nutterville, West Virginia